USS LST-930/LST(H)-930 was an  in the United States Navy. Like many of her class, she was not named and is properly referred to by her hull designation.

Construction
LST-930 was laid down on 9 June 1944, at Hingham, Massachusetts, by the Bethlehem-Hingham Shipyard; launched on 12 July 1944; and commissioned on 6 August 1944.

Service history
During World War II, LST-930 was assigned to the Asiatic-Pacific theater and participated in the assault and occupation of Iwo Jima in February 1945, and the assault and occupation of Okinawa Gunto from April through June 1945.

On 15 September 1945, she was redesignated LST(H)-930 and performed occupation duty in the Far East until late October 1945. The ship returned to the United States and was decommissioned on 26 June 1946, and struck from the Navy list on 31 July, that same year. On 8 June 1948, the ship was sold to the Humble Oil and Refining Co., Houston, Texas, for operation.

Awards
LST-930 earned two battle star for World War II service.

Notes

Citations

Bibliography 

Online resources

External links
 

 

LST-542-class tank landing ships
World War II amphibious warfare vessels of the United States
Ships built in Hingham, Massachusetts
1944 ships